The South Carolina State Hospital was a publicly funded state-run psychiatric hospital in Columbia, South Carolina.  Founded in 1821 as the South Carolina Lunatic Asylum, it was one of the first public mental hospitals established in the United States.   The Mills Building, its first building, was designed by early American architect Robert Mills, and is a National Historic Landmark.  The hospital had more than 1,000 patients in 1900, but with the transition of mental health facilities to community settings, it closed in the late 1990s. While buildings on the campus were temporarily used for inpatient services into the early 2000s, they were not part of the State Hospital, but other inpatient facilities of the agency (e.g., Morris Village Alcohol and Drug Treatment Center and G. Werber Bryan Psychiatric Hospital). Several buildings on its campus housed offices and storage facilities of the state's Department of Mental Health until approximately 2014. In October of 2014, the Department sold the first parcels of the property into private ownership and received the first sale proceeds ($1.5 Million). The William S. Hall Psychiatric Institute (an inpatient psychiatric facility for children and adolescents) remained on the campus until 2015, when it moved to a new facility on Department's Northeast Columbia Campus. As of January 2021, 100% of the South Carolina State Hospital (also known as "Bull Street") property had been transferred to private ownership. Proceeds from the sale of the Bull Street property must be used to benefit patients of the Agency. As of August 2020, the SC Mental Health Commission had authorized the expenditure of $10 million of the proceeds, $6.5 million, for the development of additional community housing for patients.

History
The South Carolina Lunatic Asylum was authorized by state legislation in 1821, and was the second such state hospital (after Virginia's) to be authorized.  Its original building, designed by Robert Mills and featuring the latest innovations in fire resistance and patient security, was built between 1822 and 1827. The hospital was at first only open to paying patients, with indigent patient costs billed to the government of the region from which they came. Admission was for the most part limited to whites, although some African-Americans (including slaves) were admitted before 1848, when their admission was formally authorized.

The hospital's facilities were enlarged, in part by expansion of the Mills building, and in part by the construction of new buildings on the campus. In 1892, the hospital opened a nursing school (which closed in 1950), and in 1896 it changed its name to the South Carolina State Hospital for the Insane. Its campus at capacity in 1910 (and like many such facilities nationwide, underfunded, understaffed, and its patients not well cared-for), a second campus was opened for African-Americans north of Columbia. Known first as the Palmetto State Hospital then later named Crafts-Farrow Hospital, its campus served for many years as a geriatric care facility, and now houses multiple divisions of the Department of Mental Health, including Public Safety, Training and Research, Information Technology, Food Services, Print Shop, etc.

Ongoing issues with staffing, funding, and patient conditions persisted in the 20th century, and the state began transitioning mental health care into community settings in 1920. Legal action surrounding patient care and funding in its hospital facilities in the 1980s resulted in a more focused effort to reduce the hospital population. In 1996, the two campuses were consolidated, with 410 beds.  Buildings no longer used for patient care, for a time housed offices of the state Department of Mental Health. The historic Mills building housed the Department of Health & Environmental Control.

While the Department of Health and Environmental Control still occupies the Mills-Jarrett complex, the remainder of the campus has been sold to a private developer. The Department of Mental Health ended its use of the site in December 2015, when the William S. Hall Children's institute relocated to another campus. On September 12, 2020, a fire destroyed a portion of the central Babcock Building. However, developers have moved forward with renovation to apartments.

See also
List of National Historic Landmarks in South Carolina
National Register of Historic Places listings in Columbia, South Carolina

References

External links

South Carolina State Hospital, Mills Building, Richland County (2100 Bull St., Columbia), with 20 photos, at South Carolina Department of Archives and History

National Historic Landmarks in South Carolina
Historic American Buildings Survey in South Carolina
Hospitals in South Carolina
Buildings and structures in Columbia, South Carolina
Hospital buildings completed in 1827
National Register of Historic Places in Richland County, South Carolina
1827 establishments in South Carolina
Historically black hospitals in the United States